Markos Botsaris ( c. 1788 – 21 August 1823) was a chieftain of the Souliotes and hero of the Greek War of Independence, and general of the Greek army. He played a key role in relieving the First Siege of Missolonghi in 1822–1823 and was awarded the title of General of Western Greece by the revolutionary Greek government. He was killed during the Battle of Karpenisi and was buried in Missolonghi with full honors. Today Botsaris is among the most revered national heroes in Greece.

Family and early life (1788–1820)
Botsaris was born into one of the leading clans of the Souliotes, the Botsaris in the region of Souli, Epirus. The Botsaris clan came from the village of Dragani (today Ambelia), near Paramythia and were one of the oldest clans which settled in Souli. Their name may be related to the Albanian word buzë as hinted by written variants of the name in the 19th century. The patron saint of the clan was Donatus of Euroea. The Botsaris had built a church dedicated to Donatus in the areas of Souli they directly controlled. Botsaris' mother tongue was the Souliotic dialect of Albanian.

They were biggest of the Souliot clans which negotiated and eventually collaborated with Ali Pasha. Perraivos (1815) is one of the contemporary historians who recorded the collaboration with Ali Pasha since the spring of 1800. Perraivos attributes this shift to the "madness of greed" of George Botsaris (grandfather of Markos Botsaris) whom he calls a "paid traitor". Other historians of the 19th century follow the same assessment. In modern historiography, the explanation of his political stance through "greed" is considered an oversimplification. Like all other Souliot clans, the Botsaris first and foremost worked for the interests of their own clan, and sought to improve the wealth and political position of their clan, hence the stance of George Botsaris and all Souliot leaders is interpreted in this framework. For the Botsaris clan, since 1799 when Ali Pasha took control of the villages of Lakka Souli which were previously under the sphere of influence of the Botsaris clan, integration in the Ottoman system was the only viable political option. In 1800, George Botsaris received a large sum and the position of the armatolos of Tzoumerka, and the Botsaris clan left Souli and settled in Vourgareli of Arta. This was the first time that a Souliot clan became part of the Ottoman political system. The departure of the Botsaris clan weakened Souli as they were a significant part of its force.

After the surrender of Souli, Souliote clans chose divergent paths but many were ultimately led to move to the Ionian Islands and in south Greece. Kitsos Botsaris who had succeeded his father as armatolos of Tzoumerka became a target. Botsaris gathered his clan and 1,200 Souliotes who retreated to Agrafa. In January 1804, they were attacked by Ali Pasha's army under Beqir Bey with support from the local armatoloi Zikos Michos, Tzimas Alexis and Poulis. As the Botsaris clan was given the important armatolik of Tzoumerka, other armatoloi had targeted them. The Souliotes were besieged for 3 months on the grounds of the monastery of the Assumption of Mary. In the final battle, on 7 April, most Souliotes were killed and of those who survived many were taken hostage. About 80 escaped from this battle. Ali Pasha at the same time published a firman which targeted the Botsaris clan which was hunted down. Kitsos Botsaris and his family with a few others managed to escape to Parga and later settled in the Ionian Islands. He returned to the Pashalik of Yanina in 1813 when Ali Pasha gave him again the armatolik of Tzoumerka but as soon as he returned he was murdered by a Gogos Bakolas.

Markos Botsaris lived since the age of sixteen in the Ionian Islands, in particular in Lefkada where the family resettled. In Lefkada he lived in the same household ( corporate household/extended patrilineage) like his father Kitsos who headed the household even after Markos was married, his father's third wife, his own wife (Eleni Karakitsou), his brothers and sisters, his deceased uncle's widow (Zoitsa Bakopani) and their housemaid. Kitsos was married three times and had in total 18 children; 12 of them survived into adulthood. Markos was married for the first time in 1806 to the daughter of A. Karakitsos, Eleni. They were divorced a few years later ca. 1810. Botsaris accused his wife of cheating in the petition to get a divorce, she defended herself by claiming that her father-in-law (Kitsos) would have killed her as is the custom of the Albanians (nomos eis tous Alvanitas) if such an accusation was true. The real reason of the divorce possibly had to do with her not being able to bear children, which was seen as extremely important in Souliot society.

At an early age, he joined other Souliotes who served in the Albanian Regiment of the French army for 11 years and became one of the regiment's officers. In 1815 he returned to Epirus.

Epirus (1820–1821) 
In 1820, with other Souliotes and his uncle Notis Botsaris, he came back to Epirus and fought against Ali Pasha and the Ottoman army at the Siege of Ioannina, but soon the Souliotes changed side and fought the Ottoman army together with the troops of Ali Pasha, in exchange for a promise of regaining their former region, the Souli.

Botsaris, with about 300–350 men appeared on Mount Satovetza, opposite the sultan's camp, and attacked in December 1820. The fortress of Variades was captured, and Botsaris fortified himself in it. From there, he attacked a convoy at Kompsades, followed by taking the position of Pente Pigadia, defeating a force of thousands of Ottomans. Negotiations began with the Ottomans and continued until March 1821, when Christoforos Perraivos arrived at Epirus and informed the Souliotes about the existence of Filiki Eteria and the upcoming war of independence.

Greek War of Independence

 

In 1821, Botsaris took part in the revolution against the Ottoman Empire. He and other Souliot captains, including Kitsos Tzavelas, Notis Botsaris, Lampros Veikos, and Giotis Danglis only enlisted fellow Souliot kin into their bands. At the outbreak of the Greek War of Independence, he distinguished himself by his courage, tenacity and skill as a partisan leader in the fighting in western Greece, and was conspicuous in the defence of Missolonghi during the first siege of the city (1822–1823).

Recognizing his bravery and excellent military skill, the Greek Government made him General of Western Greece. This infuriated the rest of the unranked Greek chieftains, so Botsaris responded by tearing his military diploma apart in order to show them that he did not care for ranks, but only for the greater good of his country.

On the night of 21 August 1823 he led the attack on Karpenisi by 350 Souliotes, against approximately 4,000 Ottoman troops who formed the vanguard of the army of Mustafa Pasha, the Pasha of Shkoder (modern northern Albania). Botsaris' men ambushed the enemy camp and inflicted serious casualties, but Botsaris was shot in the head and killed.

Botsaris was buried with full honors in Missolonghi. After the Ottomans captured the city, in 1826, his grave was desecrated by Ottoman Albanian groups.

Family and companions
Many of his family members became key figures of the Greek political establishment. Markos' brother Kostas (Constantine) Botsaris, who also fought at Karpenisi and completed the victory, lived on to become a respected Greek general and parliamentarian in the Greek kingdom. He died in Athens on 13 November 1853. His daughter, Katerina "Rosa" Botsari, was in the service of Queen Amalia of Greece.
Markos's son, Dimitrios Botsaris, born in 1813, was three times minister of war Kings Otto and George I. He died in Athens on 17 August 1870.

Evangelis Zappas, the renowned benefactor and founder of the modern Olympic Games, was the aide-de-camp and close friend of Markos Botsaris.

Dictionary 
Botsaris is also widely considered to be the author of a Greek–Albanian lexicon written in Corfu in 1809, at the insistence of François Pouqueville, Napoleon Bonaparte's general consul at the court of Ali Pasha in Ioannina. The dictionary is of importance for the knowledge of the extinct Souliot dialect. However, although the book is known as the Botsaris dictionary, scholar Xhevat Lloshi has argued in several works that Botsaris couldn't have possibly written that dictionary by himself, both because of his young age, and because of a note of Pouqueville that clearly says that the dictionary was drafted under the dictation of Marko's father, uncle, and future father-in-law. The Albanian part is connected to the Tosk Albanian dialect with many archaic elements which are related to Arbëresh dialects of southern Italy. The dictionary of Botsaris belongs to the pre-ethnic phase of the history of the Balkans. Titos Yochalas, a Greek historian, knowledgeable in Albanian, who studied and edited the manuscript, noticing that some Greek words are translated into Albanian in more than one way, believes that Botsaris was writing the Greek words and the elders were translating into Albanian. As many of the entries seem unlikely to be useful either for the Suliotes or the Albanians of that time and circumstances, Yochalas believes that the dictionary was composed after Pouqueville's initiative, possibly as a source for a future French-Albanian dictionary. According to Doris Kyriazis, Botsaris transcribed the lexicon, but he was not the author of it.

Legacy
Many Philhellenes visiting Greece had admired Botsaris' courage and numerous poets wrote poems about him. American poet Fitz-Greene Halleck wrote a poem entitled Marco Bozzaris, Juste Olivier also wrote an award-winning poem for him, in 1825. The national poet of Greece, Dionysios Solomos, composed a poem titled "On Markos Botsaris", in which he likens the mourning over Botsaris' body to the lamentation of Hector, as described in the last book of the Iliad. His memory is still celebrated in popular ballads in Greece. The Greek Vlachs also sing the heroic deeds of Markos Botsaris, in Greek language. Another mid 19th c. Greek song from Epirus mentions Botsaris' widow lamenting the loss of her husband.

Markos is honoured in poems of Kalvos, Palamas, Balaorites as well as in plays of Zampelios, Alkeos and Soutsos. In Greek music, the Zakynthian composer Pavlos Carrer composed in 1858 the opera "Marco Bozzari" to his honour. In 1858 excerpts from the opera were performed in Athens in the presence of King Otto. Also, there are several folk songs dedicated to Botsaris, like a Tsamiko from Central Greece, named (Song) Of Markos Botsaris, and from the Greek minority of southern Albania (Καημένε Μάρκο Μπότσαρη). Popular dramas and school plays were written soon after his death. The Song of Marko Boçari is an Albanian folk song of the 19th century that narrates and laments his death.

Botsaris was depicted on the reverse of the Greek 50 lepta coin of 1976–2001. He often adorns posters in Greek classrooms, government offices, and military barracks, as a member of the Greek pantheon of national heroes.

Gallery

See also
 Botzaris Metro Station

References

Sources

 
 Botsaris, 180 Years from the Greek Revolution

External links
 

1788 births
1823 deaths
Souliotes
Eastern Orthodox Christians from Greece
Members of the Church of Greece
Greek military leaders of the Greek War of Independence
Greek military personnel killed in action
Missolonghi
Macedonia under the Ottoman Empire
French military personnel of the Napoleonic Wars